Code Red (also known as Code Red Chakravyuh, Code Red Umeed, Code Red Awaaz, Code Red Talaash) is an Indian television crime show, which had a premiere on Colors TV on 19 January 2015. The show was hosted by Sakshi Tanwar.

Code Red Talaash is an Indian supernatural television sub-series of Code Red, which airs on Colors TV. The series premiered on 22 April 2015 on Wednesday and airs Wednesday thorough Friday nights for an hour. The series showcases real life stories in view of super common forces. The sub-series shows some of the most popular paranormal occurrences in India and narrates the untold story behind every supernatural incidence. The show is hosted by Anita Hassanandani and Shaleen Malhotra.

The series is a part of Code Red that airs on 
Colors TV and explores the myths behind various haunted places in India.

Cast
 Ankit Bhardwaj
 Shahab Khan as Various 
 Akshamma Singh as Aashima 
 Anita Hassanandani as Host
 Mahima Makwana as Riya
 Jatin Shah as Rishabh
 Manish Choudhary as Dr. Prashant Bhaskar
 Megha Gupta as Bindiya
 Mona Singh as Pragya
 Paridhi Sharma as Host
 Sakshi Tanwar as Host
 Anup Soni as Rajeev
 Karmveer Choudhary as Villain 
 Asha Negi as Saraswati
 Shaleen Malhotra as Host
 Shilpa Saklani as Ganga
 Shweta Kanoje as Pratibha in School bus hijack episode
 Yash Sinha as Kabir
 Adaa Khan as Zarina/Aafreen Murtaza
 Ssumier Pasricha 
 Ashish Dixit as Saurabh in Exorcism of Jennifer.
 Shiju Kataria
 Rahul Verma Rajput
 Rakesh Kukreti 
 Bhavesh Balchandani
 Urvashi Dholakia
 Jannat Zubair Rahmani as Simran, Surili
 Yash Goyal
 Saurabh Pandey as Munna Yadav
 Pooran Kiri 
 Aditya Kapadia as cameo 
 Kanishka Soni
 Geetanjali Mishra as Jyoti/Nisha
 Yashashri Masurkar
 Anju Mahendru
 Richa Soni 
 Nishad Vaidya as Govind
 Kanwar Dhillon
 Ayush Shah
 Khushank Arora
 Meghna Aditya
 Gaurav Bajaj
 Jayashree Venketaramanan
 Rushad Rana
 Bhavana Pani
 Neetha Shetty as Priyanka
 Deepna Kumar 
 Supriya Kumari
 Mohit Shrivastava 
 Pankaj Vishnu 
 Kiran Janjani
 Neha Bamb
 Pooja Welling
 Rucha Gujarathi as Neha
 Dalljiet Kaur as Scarlett
 Priya Shinde
 Aishwarya Sharma
 Ahsaas Channa as Sarika

References

External links
 

2015 Indian television series debuts
2015 Indian television series endings
Hindi-language television shows
Television shows set in Mumbai
Colors TV original programming
Television series by Optimystix Entertainment